Bézout's theorem is a statement in algebraic geometry concerning the number of common zeros of  polynomials in  indeterminates. In its original form the theorem states that in general the number of common zeros equals the product of the degrees of the polynomials. It is named after Étienne Bézout.

In some elementary texts, Bézout's theorem refers only to the case of two variables, and asserts that, if two plane algebraic curves of degrees  and  have no component in common, they have  intersection points, counted with their multiplicity, and including points at infinity and points with complex coordinates.

In its modern formulation, the theorem states that, if  is the number of common points over an algebraically closed field of  projective hypersurfaces defined by homogeneous polynomials in  indeterminates,  then  is either infinite, or equals the product of the degrees of the polynomials. Moreover, the finite case occurs almost always.

In the case of two variables and in the case of affine hypersurfaces, if multiplicities and points at infinity are not counted, this theorem provides only an upper bound of the number of points, which is almost always reached. This bound is often referred to as the Bézout bound.

Bézout's theorem is fundamental in computer algebra and effective algebraic geometry, by showing that most problems have a computational complexity that is at least exponential in the number of variables. It follows that in these areas, the best complexity that can be hoped for will occur with algorithms that have a complexity which is polynomial in the Bézout bound.

History
In the case of plane curves, Bézout's theorem was essentially stated by Isaac Newton in his proof of lemma 28 of volume 1 of his Principia in 1687, where he claims that two curves have a number of intersection points given by the product of their degrees.

The general theorem was later published in 1779 in Étienne Bézout's Théorie générale des équations algébriques. He supposed the equations to be "complete", which in modern terminology would translate to generic. Since with generic polynomials, there are no points at infinity, and all multiplicities equal one, Bézout's formulation is correct, although his proof does not follow the modern requirements of rigor.

This and the fact that the concept of intersection multiplicity was outside the knowledge of his time led to a sentiment expressed by some authors that his proof was neither correct nor the first proof to be given.

The proof of the statement that includes multiplicities requires an accurate definition of the intersection multiplicities, and was therefore not possible before the 20th century.

The definitions of multiplicities that was given during the first half of the 20th century involved continuous and infinitesimal deformations. It follows that the proofs of this period apply only over the field of complex numbers.

It is only in 1958 that Jean-Pierre Serre gave a purely algebraic definition of multiplicities, which led to a proof valid over any algebraically closed field.

Statement

Plane curves
Suppose that X and Y are two plane projective curves defined over a field F that do not have a common component (this condition means that  X and Y are defined by polynomials, without common divisor of positive degree). Then the total number of intersection points of X and Y with coordinates in an algebraically closed field E which contains F, counted with their multiplicities, is equal to the product of the degrees of X and Y.

General case
The generalization in higher dimension may be stated as:

There are various proofs of this theorem, which either are expressed in purely algebraic terms, or use the language or algebraic geometry. Three algebraic proofs are sketched below.

Bézout's theorem has been generalized as the so-called multi-homogeneous Bézout theorem.

Affine case
The affine case of the theorem is the following statement, that has been proven in 1983 by David Masser and Gisbert Wüstholz.

Let  affine hypersurfaces  which are defined  over an algebraically closed field by   polynomials in   variables, of degrees  Then either the number of intersection points is infinite, or the number of intersection points, counted with their multiplicities, is at most the product  If the hypersurfaces are in relative general position, then there are exactly  intersection points, all with multiplicity 1.

This version is not a direct consequence of the general case, because it is possible to have a finite number of intersection points in the affine space, with infinitely many intersection points at infinity. The above statement is a special case of a more general statement, which is the result that Masser and Wüstholz proved. 

For stating the general result, one has to recall that the intersection points form an algebraic set, and that there is a finite number of intersection points if and only if all component of the intersection have a zero dimension (an algebraic set of positive dimension has an infinity of points over an algebraically closed field). An intersection point is said isolated if it does not belong to a component of positive dimension of the intersection; the terminology make sense, since an isolated intersection point has neighborhoods (for Zariski topology or for the usual topology in the case of complex hypersurfaces) that does not contain any other intersection point.

Let  projective hypersurfaces  which are defined  over an algebraically closed field by  homogeneous polynomials in   variables, of degrees  Then, the sum of the multiplicities of their isolated intersection points   is at most the product  The result remains valid for any number  of hypersurfaces, if one sets  in the case  and, otherwise, if one orders the degrees for having  That is, there is no isolated intersection point if  and, otherwise, the bound is the product of the smallest degree and the  largest degrees.

Examples (plane curves)

Two lines
The equation of a line in a Euclidean plane is linear, that is, it equates to zero a polynomial of degree one. In the latter case, the lines are parallel and meet at a point at infinity.

One can verify this with equations. The equation of a first line can be written in slope-intercept form  or, in projective coordinates  (if the line is vertical, one may exchange  and ).

If  that is  the two line are parallel as having the same slope. If  they are distinct, and the substituted equation gives . This gives the point at infinity of projective coordinates .

A line and a curve
The fundamental theorem of algebra implies that it can be factored in linear factors.

If  is viewed as the coordinate of infinity, a factor equal to  represents an intersection point at infinity.

If at least one partial derivative of the polynomial  is not zero at an intersection point, then the tangent of the curve at this point is defined (see ), and the intersection multiplicity is greater than one if and only if the line is tangent to the curve. If all partial derivatives are zero, the intersection point is a singular point, and the intersection multiplicity is at least two.

Two conic sections
Two conic sections generally intersect in four points, some of which may coincide. To properly account for all intersection points, it may be necessary to allow complex coordinates and include the points on the infinite line in the projective plane. For example:
Two circles never intersect in more than two points in the plane, while Bézout's theorem predicts four.  The discrepancy comes from the fact that every circle passes through the same two complex points on the line at infinity. Writing the circle  in homogeneous coordinates, we get  from which it is clear that the two points  and  lie on every circle.  When two circles do not meet at all in the real plane, the two other intersections have non-real coordinates, or if the circles are concentric then they meet at exactly the two points on the line at infinity with an intersection multiplicity of two.
Any conic should meet the line at infinity at two points according to the theorem. A hyperbola meets it at two real points corresponding to the two directions of the asymptotes. A parabola meets it at only one point, but it is a point of tangency and therefore counts twice.
The following pictures show examples in which the circle  meets another ellipse in fewer intersection points because at least one of them has multiplicity greater than one:

Multiplicity

The concept of multiplicity is fundamental for Bézout's theorem, as it allows having an equality instead of a much weaker inequality.

Intuitively, the multiplicity of a common zero of several polynomials is the number of zeros into which the common zero can split when the coefficients are slightly changed. For example, a tangent to a curve is a line that cuts the curve at a point that splits in several points if the line is slightly moved. This number is two in general (ordinary points), but may be higher (three for inflection points, four for undulation points, etc.). This number is the "multiplicity of contact" of the tangent.

This definition of a multiplicities by deformation was sufficient until the end of the 19th century, but has several problems that led to more convenient modern definitions: Deformations are difficult to manipulate; for example, in the case of a root of a univariate polynomial, for proving that the multiplicity obtained by deformation equals the multiplicity of the corresponding linear factor of the polynomial, one has to know that the roots are continuous functions of the coefficients. Deformations cannot be used over fields of positive characteristic. Moreover, there are cases where a convenient deformation is difficult to define (as in the case of more than two planes curves having a common intersection point), and even cases where no deformation is possible.

Currently, following Jean-Pierre Serre, a multiplicity is generally defined as the length of a local ring associated with the point where the multiplicity is considered. Most specific definitions can be shown to be special case of Serre's definition.

In the case of Bézout's theorem, the general intersection theory can be avoided, as there are proofs (see below) that associate to each input data for the theorem a polynomial in the coefficients of the equations, which factorizes into linear factors, each corresponding to a single intersection point. So, the multiplicity of an intersection point is the multiplicity of the corresponding factor. The proof that this multiplicity equals the one that is obtained by deformation, results then from the fact that the intersection points and the factored  polynomial depend continuously on the roots.

Proofs

Using the resultant (plane curves)
Their zeros are the homogeneous coordinates of two projective curves.

The above technical condition ensures that  is unique.

As  is a homogeneous polynomial in two indeterminates, the fundamental theorem of algebra implies that  is a product of  linear polynomials.

Proving the equality with other definitions of intersection multiplicities relies on the technicalities of these definitions and is therefore outside the scope of this article.

Using -resultant

In the early 20th century, Francis Sowerby Macaulay introduced the multivariate resultant (also known as Macaulay's resultant) of  homogeneous polynomials in  indeterminates, which is  generalization of the usual resultant of two polynomials. Macaulay's resultant is a polynomial function of the coefficients of  homogeneous polynomials that is zero if and only the polynomials have a nontrivial (that is some component is nonzero) common zero in an algebraically closed field containing the coefficients.

The -resultant is a particular instance of Macaulay's resultant, introduced also by Macaulay. The -resultant is a homogeneous polynomial in  whose degree is the product of the degrees of the 

This proves Bézout's theorem, if the multiplicity of a common zero is defined as the multiplicity of the corresponding linear factor of the -resultant. As for the preceding proof, the equality of this multiplicity with the definition by deformation results from the continuity of the -resultant as a function of the coefficients of the 

This proof of Bézout's theorem seems the oldest proof that satisfies the modern criteria of rigor.

Using the degree of an ideal
Bézout's theorem can be proved by recurrence on the number of polynomials 
by using the following theorem.

For a (sketched) proof using Hilbert series, see .

Beside allowing a conceptually simple proof of Bézout's theorem, this theorem  is fundamental for intersection theory, since this theory is essentially devoted to the study of intersection multiplicities when the hypotheses of the above theorem do not apply.

See also

Notes

References
 

 Alternative translation of earlier (2nd) edition of Newton's Principia.

External links
 
 
 Bezout's Theorem at MathPages

Theorems in plane geometry
Incidence geometry
Intersection theory
Theorems in algebraic geometry